Brave People, initially announced on release abroad by Mosfilm as The Horsemen, is a 1950 Soviet film, directed by Konstantin Yudin. The film starred Sergei Gurzo and Alexei Gribov, and was Yudin's first thriller film, as he had previously worked predominantly on comedies.

The film was positively received and was the number one film in the Soviet Union during the year of its release.

The film is set in the Great Patriotic War, but the plot, an adventure about a boy and his racehorse set in the Caucasus, is strikingly different from the grim realism of other war films of the era.

Synopsis
The setting of the film is USSR during the pre-war years. Vasiliy Govorukhin (Sergei Gurzo), a young stud farm worker, who has nurtured an excellent horse with the nickname Buyan; but the cruel trainer Vadim Beletsky (Oleg Solyus) has strong doubts concerning the outstanding qualities of the horse.

True character of Beletsky is exposed during the Great Patriotic War; it turns out that he is a German spy and saboteur, also he has already prepared to convey the Soviet elite horses to the fascists.

Stud farm workers, caught on occupied by Nazi troops territory, prepare and organize a Soviet partisan unit; his chief party organizer chose Kozhin (Nikolay Mordvinov). The detachment is intended for combat, intelligence and other operations behind enemy lines.

Vasiliy Govorukhin, along with his faithful horse Buyan show their courage and resourcefulness; together they are to expose enemy spies and save the best horses from the export to Germany.

This turns out to be a difficult task, because the Nazis take hostage Soviet women, children and old men and put them into a wagon, hitched to the rolling stock together with the horses ...

Cast
Sergei Gurzo - Vasily Terentevich Govorukhin, stud farm worker
Alexey Gribov - Konstantin Sergeevich Voronov, Nadya's grandfather, senior trainer of the stud farm
Tamara Chernova - Nadezhda Petrovna Voronova
Oleg Solyus - trainer of the stud farm Vadim Beletsky who is also the German spy Otto Fuchs
Nikolay Mordvinov - Kozhin, party worker, commander of the guerrilla unit
Vladimir Dorofeev - Kapiton Kapitonovich, veterinarian
Kapan Bader - Hakim, partisan
Sergei Bobrov - Prohor Ilyich, director of the stud farm
Oleg Potocki - Kolya Deviatkin
George Gumilevsky - Uncle Stepan, herdsman
Victor Proklov - herdsman
Simon Svashenko - herdsman
Rostislav Plyatt - von Schwalbe, a German officer

References

External links

1950 films
Soviet drama films
1950s Russian-language films
Films directed by Konstantin Yudin